BanxQuote was the foremost provider and licensor of indexes and analytics used as a barometer of the U.S. banking and mortgage markets until its exit in 2010. Its bank rate website and consumer banking marketplace featured dynamically updated daily market rates on banking, mortgage and loan products throughout the United States, until its exit in 2010.

History and activities
BanxQuote was established by its parent BanxCorp in 1984, and its Internet operations were launched at a BanxQuote National Banking Conference held at Salomon Brothers in New York, on April 7, 1995.

Clients of the firm have included hundreds of financial institutions nationwide and its indexes were frequently used as a trusted source and performance benchmark by public policymakers, government agencies, major banks and corporations.

BanxQuote operated an online national banking marketplace for 15 years, until its exit in 2010

It featured rates on money market accounts, savings and jumbo certificate of deposit (CDs), mortgage loans, home equity and auto loans for various terms and amounts.

BanxQuote also provided proprietary state-by-state, regional, and national composite benchmarks for its various banking and lending products. Clients of the firm have included hundreds of banks and financial institutions nationwide. In 1985, The Wall Street Journal started featuring BanxQuote for 17 consecutive years.

BanxQuote on Bloomberg Terminal 
BanxQuote current and historical proprietary data, indices, charts and analytical tools were available on Bloomberg Terminals from 1995 until its exit from the market in 2015, reaching over 250,000 financial market professionals worldwide.

The BanxQuote Index, Trademark and Performance benchmarks
The Dow Jones Barron's Dictionary of Banking Terms defines the BanxQuote Money Market Index(tm) as an "Index of rates paid by investors on negotiable certificates of deposit and high yield savings accounts, compiled weekly by BanxCorp. The index offers a side-by-side comparison of rates paid by selected banks and savings institutions on small-denomination (under $10,000) savings accounts."

The BanxQuote Conforming-Jumbo Mortgage Index(tm) is typically used to analyze the historical spread between national average conforming and jumbo mortgage rates.

BanxQuote licenses its registered trademark, proprietary indices, data, analytical tools, and financial applications to third parties.

Case studies

 AAA (American Automobile Association) Money Markets & CDs 
 General Electric Capital Corp. — GE Interest Plus 
 Ford Interest Advantage Notes issued by Ford Motor Credit Company 
 Bloomberg Professional terminals worldwide
 UBS, one of the world's leading financial institutions 
 Discover Bank, part of Discover Financial Services 
 Countrywide Bank 
 MetLife Bank, a subsidiary of MetLife, Inc.
 Capital One Direct Banking 
 Charles Schwab & Co.
 Zions Bank

Usage

BanxQuote data are cited by various government agencies, policy makers, [GSEs], Non-Profit and Religious Organizations, and economists, such as outlined below.

U.S. government agencies

 The White House Council of Economic Advisers
 U.S. Senate Committee on Banking, Housing, and Urban Affairs 
 U.S. Department of the Treasury 
 Federal Deposit Insurance Corporation (FDIC) 
 William Poole (Federal Reserve Bank president), Federal Reserve Bank of St. Louis
 Government Finance Officers Association 
 Office of Federal Housing Enterprise Oversight (OFHEO)
 Office of Thrift Supervision (OTS) - Selected Asset and Liability Price Tables; As of June 30, 2007

Government Sponsored Enterprises (GSEs)

 The Role of Freddie Mac, the Federal Home Loan Mortgage Corporation 
 Freddie Mac Provides Stability to the Mortgage Market.
 Wharton Financial Institutions Center, Working  Paper: Measuring the Benefits of Fannie Mae and Freddie Mac to Consumers

Foundations, non-profit, judiciary, and religious organizations

 F.B. Heron Foundation  - has established performance benchmarks for each asset class in its mission-related portfolio. The benchmark for deposits is the national average for two-year jumbo deposits as reported by BanxQuote.
 Michigan Court, Michigan Judicial Institute - CitiStreet Investing Webcast 
 Diocese of Monterey, California  In 2007, the bishop of Monterey established a policy that all funds of the Monterey diocese deposited in its Cash Management and Deposit and Loan programs would earn a rate tied to the BanxQuote Money Market Rate.

Press coverage and syndication
BanxQuote has been quoted and its data has been syndicated by leading print and online media, such as the following:

 Bloomberg News 
 Business Week - Current Figures of the Week 
 The Wall Street Journal - BanxQuote Money Markets Table (1985–2002) 
 WSJ.com BanxQuote Banking Center (1995–2002) 
 The New York Times BanxQuote Banking Center (1996–2002) 
 The Washington Post BanxQuote Banking Center (1996–1999) 
 Business Week BanxQuote Banking Center (1997–1999) 

BanxQuote has also received frequent press coverage by numerous other news organizations throughout the U.S., including the following:

Associated Press, U.S. News & World Report, Forbes, Fortune, American Banker, Chicago Sun-Times, The Washington Post, Tribune Business News, Seattle Post-Intelligencer, Houston Chronicle, Dallas Morning News, The Boston Globe, St. Louis Post-Dispatch, South Florida Sun-Sentinel, Kansas City Star, St. Petersburg Times, Denver Rocky Mountain News, The Milwaukee Journal Sentinel, The Journal Record, The Record (Bergen County, NJ), Kiplinger's Personal Finance Magazine, Oakland Tribune, The Salt Lake Tribune, El Diario/La Prensa, The Boston Herald, Los Angeles Business Journal, Buffalo News (Buffalo, NY), Portland Press, Herald (Maine), and the Colorado Springs Gazette Telegraph.

References

External links
BanxQuote.com website
BanxCorp corporate website

Financial services companies based in New York City
Retail financial services
American companies established in 1984
Financial services companies established in 1984
Retail companies established in 1984
American companies disestablished in 2010
Financial services companies disestablished in 2010
Retail companies disestablished in 2010
Companies based in New York (state)
Data collection
News aggregators